Dabble DB was a web application written using the Seaside web framework which allows users to create database applications using a web browser. A Dabble DB application can import data and export data in a variety of formats. Unlike most traditional relational database systems, it uses a point-and-click interface rather than relying on programming. The system is forgiving of data type issues when importing or entering data.

On June 10, 2010, Dabble DB announced that their parent company, Smallthought Systems, had been acquired by Twitter.

On March 17, 2011, Dabble DB announced that the Dabble DB service would be shut down on May 18, 2011.

On March 31, 2011, Morningstar ran a story about Dabble DB users being thrown a lifeline.

References

External links
*

Web frameworks